Leżajsk transmitter is a 130-metre guyed steel mast, localisation  of the Giedlarowa village near by Leżajsk.
The object belongs to the INFO-TV-OPERATOR company.

Transmitted programmes

Digital television MPEG-4

FM radio

See also 
 List of masts
 List of tallest structures in Poland

External links 
 http://radiopolska.pl/wykaz/pokaz_lokalizacja.php?pid=291
 http://www.infotvoperator.pl/itvfm.php?id=21
 http://www.przelaczenie.eu/mapy/podkarpackie
 http://www.dvbtmap.eu/mapcoverage.html?chid=9100

Radio masts and towers in Poland
Leżajsk County